Dharmendrasinh Aniruddsinh Jadeja (born 4 August 1990) is an Indian first-class cricketer who plays for Saurashtra in domestic cricket. He was the leading wicket-taker for Saurashtra in the 2017–18 Ranji Trophy, with 34 dismissals in six matches. He was also the leading wicket-taker for Saurashtra in the group-stage of the 2018–19 Ranji Trophy, with 38 dismissals in eight matches. In January 2019, he became the first bowler for Saurashtra to take 50 wickets in a Ranji Trophy season.

In August 2019, he was named in the India Green team's squad for the 2019–20 Duleep Trophy. He is the younger brother of Ravindra Jadeja

References

External links
 

1990 births
Living people
Indian cricketers
Saurashtra cricketers
People from Rajkot